Jyske Bank A/S is the third largest Danish bank in terms of market share.

The headquarters are located in Silkeborg, and the bank has 98 branches, in Denmark, and a single one in Germany (Hamburg). It is the second-largest bank to be listed on the Copenhagen Stock Exchange, and it is the largest bank in Denmark headquartered outside Copenhagen.

The current CEO of Jyske Bank is Anders Dam. The bank employs over 3350 individuals (as of the end of Q3, 2020).

History
Jyske Bank is the result of the merger in 1967 of four banks from the mid-Jutland area: Silkeborg Bank, Kjellerup Bank, Kjellerup Handels- og Landbobank, and the Handels- og Landbrugsbank in Silkeborg.  These banks trace their roots back to the mid-19th Century.

1968 – Jyske Bank acquired Banken for Brædstrup og Omegn.
1970 – Jyske Bank acquired Samsø Bank.
1970 – Jyske Bank acquired Odder Landbobank.
1981 – Jyske Bank acquired Copenhagen-based Finansbanken, giving it national coverage.   
1983 – Jyske Bank acquired Vendelbobanken.
1989 – Jyske Bank acquired Holstebro Bank.
2011 – Jyske Bank acquired most of Fjordbank Mors.
2013 – Jyske Bank acquired Spar Lolland201
2014 – Jyske Bank acquired BRFkredit A/S
2022– Jyske Bank acquired the Danish branch of Svenska Handelsbanken

International operations

1981 – With its merger with Finansbanken, Jyske Bank acquired the subsidiary in Zürich, Switzerland, that Finansbanken had established in 1970 under the name Finanz- und Investmentbank.  This is the oldest Scandinavian-owned subsidiary in Switzerland.  In 1985 the subsidiary's name became Jyske Bank (Schweiz).
1983 – Jyske Bank established an office in London and three years later upgraded it to a branch.
1984 – Jyske Bank established a representative office of Jyske Bank Private Banking in Fuengirola on the Spanish Costa del Sol.
1987 
 Jyske Bank acquired Banco Galliano (est. 1855), a family-owned bank and the oldest bank in Gibraltar.
 Jyske Bank acquired Hamburger Handelsbank (est. 1921), giving it a branch in Hamburg.
1988 – Jyske Bank converted its representative office in Spain into a subsidiary that it later converted back to a representative office.
2002 – Jyske bank formed a strategic alliance with Nykredit to become a major actor in the Danish finance industry.
2003 – Jyske Bank established representative office for Jyske Bank Private Banking in Cannes, on the French Côte d'Azur.
2004 
 Jyske Bank established a representative office in Poland to conduct private banking. 
 Jyske Bank acquired 60% of Berben's Effectenkantoor in Echt, Netherlands.
2007 – Jyske Bank Private Banking closed the offices in Warsaw and Fuengirola.
2008 – Jyske Bank closed its branch in London.
2014 – Jyske Bank sells Berben's Effectenkantoor
2015 – Jyske Bank closes Jyske Bank Schweiz
2020 – Jyske Bank sells Jyske Bank (Gibraltar) Ltd. — leaving the Hamburg branch as the only one outside Denmark.
2022 - Jyske Bank confirm discussions on the acquisition of Handelsbanken Danish Operations.

Subsidiaries
 Jyske Realkredit A/S
 JN Data A/S
 Jyske Finans A/S

Remaining international branches or subsidiaries
 Jyske Bank, Filiale Hamburg (Germany)

Products
Jyske Bank offers a range of banking products, including savings and loans, mortgages, private banking, and business banking.

Controversies
Jyske Bank was mentioned in the Panama Papers and the bank was used by Sergei Pugachev for money laundering. In 2018 the Danish FSA criticised the bank for insufficient measures to prevent money laundering.

References

External links

Bank Profile: Jyske Bank A/S

Companies listed on Nasdaq Copenhagen
Banks of Denmark
Companies based in Silkeborg Municipality
Danish companies established in 1967